The Dorset Women's League is a football league which sits at level 7 of the league structure of women's football in England. The winner of the division is eligible for promotion to Division One of the South West Regional Women's Football League and there is no relegation from this division as there are no leagues ranked below this one in the pyramid system. It is affiliated to the Dorset Football Association.

The 2021-2022 season saw Weymouth FC Women win the title in just their second season, losing just one game all season on their way to promotion.

Teams
The teams competing in the league during the 2021–22 season are:
Broadstone Ladies
Dorchester Town Ladies
Gillingham Town Ladies
Merley Cobham Sports Youth Ladies
Poole Town Ladies Reserves 
Redlands Rebels Ladies
Shaftesbury Town Ladies
Weymouth FC Women

Former champions

References

External links
Dorset Women's League on Full Time

7
Football in Dorset